Ralmitaront (developmental code names RG-7906 and RO-6889450) is an investigational antipsychotic drug which is undergoing clinical trials for the treatment of acute exacerbation of schizophrenia and schizoaffective disorder.  It is a partial agonist of the TAAR1. The medication is being developed by the pharmaceutical company Hoffmann-La Roche. Ralmitaront has completed phase 1 clinical trials. Phase 2 trials are ongoing.

See also
 List of investigational antipsychotics § Monoamine receptor modulators

References

Antipsychotics
Carboxamides
Experimental drugs
Morpholines
Pyrazoles
TAAR1 agonists